The Great CityGames was a major street athletics event held annually in Manchester. It was held in conjunction to the Great Manchester Run. The first event was in May 2009, the last event in May 2018.

The event was originally designed to promote the Great Run, however, the Games soon became a major British athletics event, attracting athletes such as Usain Bolt, David Rudisha and Kim Collins.

Events

Men's

Women's

Mixed

References

Sports competitions in Manchester
Annual sporting events in the United Kingdom
Annual events in England
Recurring sporting events established in 2009
2009 establishments in England
Athletics in Greater Manchester
Annual track and field meetings